Roma Street railway station is located in the Brisbane central business district, Queensland, Australia. It is the junction station for the North Coast, Main, Gold Coast and NSW North Coast lines. The station is one of four inner city stations that form a core corridor through the centre of Brisbane.

Although not easily visible to the public, the original 1873 Roma Street railway station building still exists within the modern complex and is listed on the Queensland Heritage Register.

History

1800s to 1940s

The construction of a railway station on Roma Street was part of a plan to extend the Main Line to Brisbane. An iron station building designed by Sir Charles Fox & Sons was to be imported from the United Kingdom for this purpose, but economic problems in Queensland led to the order being cancelled. In 1873, the Superintendent of Public Buildings Francis Stanley designed a smaller station for the site, with construction beginning in the same year under John Petrie. The station was officially opened on 14 June 1875 as Brisbane at the same time that the Main Line opened to Indooroopilly.

A goods and carriage shed were added shortly after. In 1882, Roma Street became a junction station with the North Coast line opening to Sandgate. With the opening of Central station as Brisbane's principal station on 18 August 1889, the station was renamed Roma Street. As traffic grew, so did the Roma Street precinct with a locomotive shed added.

In 1911, the precinct was rearranged with the locomotive and carriage sheds relocated to Mayne near Bowen Hills.

On 30 November 1940, Roma Street again became the principal station for long-distance services with new platforms built to the south of the existing platforms.

1970s to early 2000s

Following the opening of the Merivale Bridge on 18 November 1978, Roma Street was also served by Beenleigh line services. On 21 June 1986, it became a dual gauge station with the extension of the standard gauge NSW North Coast line from South Brisbane. In October 1986, the Brisbane Transit Centre opened to the south of the station.

As part of the quadruplication of the North Coast line to Bowen Hills, the station was rebuilt. On 1 November 1995, a new Platform 10 was opened on the station's north side as the platform for long-distance services; these services had previously used Platforms 2 and 3. Platforms 7, 8 and 9 opened on 11 June 1996 while refurbished Platforms 4, 5 and 6 reopened in January 1997.

In 2001, Roma Street Parkland opened to the north of the station on the site of the former Roma Street goods yards. Visitors not travelling on Queensland Rail services can obtain a free pass to transit through the station concourse from Roma Street to the parklands.

Platform 1 became part of the Roma Street busway station on 19 May 2008, with the construction of the Inner Northern Busway.

Cross River Rail and Brisbane Metro Projects

Roma Street Station will be affected by both the Cross River Rail and Brisbane Metro projects.

The Brisbane Transit Centre complex was planned to be demolished in 2020. Businesses in the existing buildings were closed down between late 2018 and early 2019, with reports of controversy surrounding claims for compensation by small business tenants.

According to the Cross River Rail Construction plan, new underground platforms will be constructed to service Cross River Rail services. The next stations for the Cross River Rail services will be Albert Street (southbound) and Exhibition (northbound).

The proposed Brisbane Metro Line 1 services will terminate at Roma Street Station, with the previous station being King George Square. Brisbane Metro Line 2 services will continue through Roma Street following the existing Northern Busway route, with the next stations being Normanby (northbound) and King George Square (southbound).

Due to the anticipated demolition of the Brisbane Transit Centre, a temporary long-distance bus terminal was constructed on the opposite side of Roma Street Station (near Platform 10) and opened in September 2019.

The Tunnel Boring Machine (TBM) Else broke through into the new Roma Street station cavern on the 6 August 2021.  The second one, TBM Merle, arrived on 23 August 2021.

Services
Roma Street station is served by all suburban and interurban City network lines.

It is also the terminus station for long-distance Traveltrain services and NSW TrainLink's service to Sydney. A motorail loading dock is located on Platform 10.

Services by platform

Transport links
Adjacent to the station lies the Roma Street busway station that is served by Brisbane Transport services and the Brisbane Transit Centre that is served by Crisps Coaches, Bus Queensland, Greyhound Australia, Murrays, NSW TrainLink and Premier Motor Service long-distance coach services.

References

External links

Roma Street station Queensland Rail
Roma Street station Queensland's Railways on the Internet

Francis Drummond Greville Stanley buildings
Railway stations in Brisbane
Railway stations in Australia opened in 1875
North Coast railway line, Queensland
Listed railway stations in Australia
Main Line railway, Queensland
Roma Street, Brisbane